Mokhamad Syaifuddin (born in Surabaya, Indonesia, 9 August 1992) is an Indonesian professional footballer who plays  as a defender for Liga 1 club Dewa United.

Career statistics

Club

Honours

Club 
Persebaya Surabaya
 Liga 2: 2017
 East Java Governor Cup: 2020

International
Indonesia U-23
 Southeast Asian Games  Silver medal: 2013

References

External links 
 Mokhamad Syaifuddin at Soccerway
 Mokhamad Syaifuddin at Liga Indonesia

1992 births
Living people
People from Surabaya
Sportspeople from East Java
Indonesian footballers
Liga 1 (Indonesia) players
Pelita Bandung Raya players
PSS Sleman players
Persebaya Surabaya players
Dewa United F.C. players
Indonesia youth international footballers
Association football defenders
Southeast Asian Games silver medalists for Indonesia
Southeast Asian Games medalists in football
Competitors at the 2013 Southeast Asian Games